Warren I. Cohen is an American historian specializing in the diplomatic history of the United States. He is Distinguished University Professor, Emeritus, at the University of Maryland, Baltimore County. Cohen formerly served as president of the Society for Historians of American Foreign Relations in 1984.

Biography 
Cohen received his B.A. from Columbia University in 1955, his master's degree from The Fletcher School at Tufts University, and his Ph.D. from the University of Washington. He taught at University of California, Riverside and Michigan State University before joining the faculty of the University of Maryland, Baltimore County. His scholarship has focused on the diplomatic history of the United States, especially its engagement with China. He has also written about the history of Chinese foreign policy.

Cohen served as a member and chaired the United States Department of State's Historical Advisory Committee until his resignation in 1990 in protest of the department's decision to expunge the role of the Central Intelligence Agency in 1953 Iranian coup d'état from its official publications.

He delivered the 2000 Edwin O. Reischauer Lectures at Harvard University, titled "The Asian American Century."

Cohen is the editor of The Cambridge History of American Foreign Relations. He was married to diplomatic historian Nancy Bernkopf Tucker until her death.

References 

Living people
Columbia College (New York) alumni
University of Maryland, Baltimore County faculty
University of Washington alumni
The Fletcher School at Tufts University alumni
20th-century American historians
21st-century American historians
Year of birth missing (living people)